Frank Oliver may refer to:

Frank Oliver (American football) (born 1952), American football player
Frank Oliver (footballer) (1882–?), English footballer
Frank Oliver (politician) (1853–1933), Canadian politician
Frank Oliver (rugby union) (1948–2014), New Zealand rugby player
Frank A. Oliver (1883–1968), U.S. Representative from New York
Frank L. Oliver (1922–2018), Pennsylvania House member since 1973, representing the 195th District
One of the two fictional comic book characters to use the name Kangaroo